Legislative Assembly elections took place in April and May 2011  to elect legislatures in the Indian states of Assam, Kerala, Tamil Nadu, West Bengal and Puducherry.

Legislative Assembly elections

Assam

Kerala

Puducherry

Tamil Nadu

West Bengal

By elections

Himachal Pradesh 
 Nalagarh Assembly constituency, Congress candidate Lakhvinder Singh Rana wins. Rana narrowly defeated Gurnam Kaur of the BJP, receiving 28,799 votes compared to Kaur's 27,200.

See also
 S.Y. Quraishi

References

External links

 Election Commission of India

2011 elections in India
India
2011 in India
Elections in India by year